The 2011 Daytona 500, the 53rd running of the event, was held on February 20, 2011 at Daytona International Speedway in Daytona Beach, Florida as the first race of the 2011 NASCAR Sprint Cup season. Trevor Bayne, driving for Wood Brothers Racing, won the race becoming the youngest Daytona 500 winner. Carl Edwards finished second, while David Gilliland, Bobby Labonte, and Kurt Busch rounded out the Top 5. Bayne had taken the lead shortly before the final restart and maintained it to win his first Cup Series race and Wood Brothers' fifth Daytona 500.

During the race there were 16 caution periods. There were 74 lead changes among 22 different drivers. Following the race, Edwards led the Drivers' Championship with 42 points, one ahead of Gilliland and Labonte. Ford led the Manufacturers' Championship with nine points, three ahead of Toyota and five ahead of Dodge. A total of 182,000 people attended the race, while 15.6 million watched it on television.

Report

Background

Daytona International Speedway is one of six superspeedways to hold NASCAR races, the others being Michigan International Speedway, Auto Club Speedway, Indianapolis Motor Speedway, Pocono Raceway and Talladega Superspeedway. The track's turns are banked at 31 degrees, while the front stretch, the location of the finish line, is banked at 18 degrees. Jamie McMurray was the defending race winner.

For the race, NASCAR held several test sessions on January 20–22, 2011 for teams to test the newer pavement at Daytona. NASCAR vice president for competition Robin Pemberton stated, "We'll have to get back and talk to the teams and look at the speeds from the last two days of testing. I think we have some high-water marks at 197-and-a-half [miles per hour (318 km/h)] which, depending on where they pulled up in the draft, it may be a little quick, but it's hard to say."

Every test session began in the morning at 09:00 local time (UTC-05:00), was paused for lunch from 12:00 – 13:00 local time (UTC-05:00), and concluded in the evening at 17:00 local time (UTC-05:00). During the first session on the morning of January 20, 2011, thirty-three drivers participated, and Clint Bowyer was quickest with a speed of  while David Reutimann had the highest speed of  during the second session in the afternoon. The third test session, scheduled for the morning of January 21, was cancelled because of wet weather. Several drivers decided to leave after the session, which included Reutimann, Martin Truex Jr., Jimmie Johnson, and Bowyer.

This race also marked the tenth anniversary of the death of seven-time champion Dale Earnhardt in 2001. As such, several tributes took place during the race. All of the cars fielded by Earnhardt's former team, Richard Childress Racing, and the team he started, Earnhardt Ganassi Racing, carried No. 3 decals. During the race itself, NASCAR held a "silent lap" on Lap 3, a practice that was first used in memory of Earnhardt during the 2001 season.

Entry List
 (W) denotes past 500 winner.
 (R) denotes rookie driver.
 (i) denotes driver who is ineligible for series driver points.

Practice and qualifying

Seven practice sessions were held before the race. The first two on February 12 ran 120 minutes and 105 minutes each. The next two on February 16 were for shortened 90 minutes and 55 minutes long after rain delays. Two days later, two more practice sessions were scheduled, which ran 60 and 85 minutes long. The final practice session was held on February 19. Mark Martin was quickest with a time of 48.681 seconds in the first session, less than one-tenth of a second faster than Jeff Gordon. Paul Menard was just off Gordon's pace, followed by Dale Earnhardt Jr., Jeff Burton, and Bill Elliott. Johnson was seventh, still within a second of Martin's time. In the second practice session, Martin remained fastest with a time of 48.567 seconds, less than one-tenth of a second quicker than second-placed Johnson. Burton took third place, ahead of Trevor Bayne, Menard and Gordon. Also in the second practice session, McMurray collided into the wall after his tire failed, and had to move to his back-up car.

Forty-nine cars were entered for qualifying, but only 43 raced per NASCAR's qualifying procedure. Unlike most races during the season, the qualifying session only determined the first two positions, while the rest of the drivers qualified by the 2011 Gatorade Duels. Earnhardt clinched his 10th pole position during his career, with a time of 48.364 seconds. He was joined on the front row of the grid by Jeff Gordon. Once the qualifying session completed, Earnhardt commented, "The main thing [the pole] does for me is take the pressure off Thursday's race. I can go out and have fun and not worry about where I finish or getting a good starting spot for the Daytona 500."

Kyle Busch was quickest in the rain-delayed third practice with 44.943 seconds, followed by Greg Biffle, Earnhardt, Johnson, and Juan Pablo Montoya. Earnhardt and Truex collided and hit the wall, both needing to use their back-up cars which meant Earnhardt forfeited pole position. Kasey Kahne led fourth practice with 44.985 seconds, only one-thousandth of a second faster than Joey Logano. Gordon was third ahead of David Ragan and Kyle Busch. Kurt Busch and Burton were the winners of the Gatorade Duels. The qualifying grid was finalized with Busch in third and Burton fourth. Regan Smith qualified fifth ahead of Bowyer, Kevin Harvick, Waltrip, Matt Kenseth, and Kyle Busch. Drivers who failed to qualify were 1990 winner Derrike Cope, Kevin Conway, Todd Bodine, Michael McDowell and Casey Mears. Norm Benning was entered in his no. 57, but withdrew before qualifying after his car failed to make a lap in practice.

Burton was fastest in fifth practice with a 45.767 seconds lap, ahead of Menard, Ragan, Marcos Ambrose and Hamlin. Martin led the sixth session ahead of Johnson and Kahne. Brian Vickers was next with a  46.225 seconds lap ahead of  Biffle with 46.426 seconds. Burton's 44.929 seconds topped the final practice session, followed by Bowyer and Keselowski. Robby Gordon and Kurt Busch rounded out the top five drivers, claiming the fourth and fifth positions respectively.

Race
The race began at 13:00 local time (UTC-05:00), and was televised live in the United States on Fox. Rev. Dr. L. Ronald Durham, senior pastor of the Greater Friendship Baptist Church of Daytona Beach, Florida, began pre-race ceremonies by giving the invocation. Country music artist Martina McBride performed the national anthem, and Josh Duhamel, Rosie Huntington-Whiteley and movie director Michael Bay of the upcoming film Transformers: Dark of the Moon, gave the command for the drivers to start their engines. During the pace laps, Dale Earnhardt Jr.; David Ragan, Joey Logano, and David Reutimann had to move to the rear of the grid due to changing to their back-up car. Transformers themed vehicles painted in the color schemes of Earnhardt Jr.'s, Juan Pablo Montoya's, and Jimmie Johnson's cars led the field during the pace laps as well.

Kurt Busch retained his pole position lead into the first corner, followed by outside polesitter Jeff Gordon. On the following lap, Smith began to assist Busch by drafting. On lap 3, NASCAR held a moment of silence to honor Dale Earnhardt, who died ten years ago in the 2001 race. On lap 4, A. J. Allmendinger and Mark Martin moved to the first and second positions. A lap later, the first caution was flown when Kyle Busch got turned sideways. Under caution, he made a pit stop to have his car's toe plate checked and to have the front end aligned. When the race restarted on lap 8, Kevin Harvick led but after one lap, Martin and Allmendinger passed him. Three laps later, the second caution came out when J. J. Yeley had an engine failure. Most of the drivers made pit stops under the caution, except for Brad Keselowski. At the restart, he would lead and Bobby Labonte passed him for the lead on the next lap.

On lap 17, Paul Menard, with assistance from Tony Stewart, took the lead from Labonte. Montoya and Jamie McMurray passed him and Stewart for the first and second positions four laps later. On lap 22, Harvick's engine failed, allowing the third caution to come out. During the caution, most of the front runners made pit stops under caution for mostly fuel, while some decided to change tires. Afterward, Clint Bowyer lead on the restart. He remained leading the next two laps, while Earnhardt Jr. moved to the 5th position. On lap 29, Reutimann and Michael Waltrip collided, causing a multi-car pileup, involving 17 drivers, including three of the four drivers from Hendrick Motorsports: Johnson, Martin, and Gordon. Some of the drivers who have led made pit stops during the caution, while McMurray and Montoya out in front as the race restarted lap 35.

McMurray and Montoya continued to lead for the next three laps, as 14 teams were repairing their cars in the garage after the lap 29 crash. On lap 39, Keselowski retook the lead, after having assistance from Regan Smith. Three laps later, Johnson was preparing to return to the race. On lap 43, Stewart took the lead one lap before Keselowski retook it from him. Two laps later, Robert Richardson Jr. spun off the bumper of Travis Kvapil, bringing out yet the fifth caution. He sustained major damage to his car in the accident. Under caution, the leaders made pit stops, giving the first and second positions to Terry Labonte and Dave Blaney at the restart. On lap 51, Kurt Busch led before Menard overtook him.

Menard remained leading, as Bowyer and Burton moved to the third and fourth positions on lap 53. On the following lap, they moved to first and second after passing Menard. On lap 57, the sixth caution was given after Brian Vickers' car stalled. The front runners made pit stops during the caution, as McMurray and Montoya reclaimed the first two positions at the restart. On lap 61, Johnson returned to the race after his team repaired the car in the garage. Also on the same lap, Ku. Busch overtook McMurray to become the leader, as both McMurray and Montoya fell to the 17th and 18th positions. On the 63rd lap, Logano, with assistance from Stewart, moved into the fifth position, as Kasey Kahne moved to tenth. By lap 65, Logano and Stewart had fallen to seventh and eighth. On the next lap, Burton moved into the first position. On the 67th lap, Keselowski moved to third, as Smith became the leader. Smith remained the leader until lap 72 when Jeff Burton and Bowyer passed him. By lap 73, the race had 26 lead changes. On the following lap, Burton passed Bowyer for the first position. Three laps later, Kvapil prompted the caution after spinning sideways. At the lap 78 restart, Bowyer was the leader ahead of Earnhardt Jr. in second.

On the following lap, Earnhardt Jr. overtook Bowyer for the first position. On lap 82, McMurray reclaimed the first position, as Smith made a pit stop. After leading one lap, McMurray was passed by Ryan Newman and Logano. On the 86th lap, Martin Truex Jr., with assistance from Carl Edwards, became the leader before Bowyer and Burton passed them on lap 87. Five laps later, Kurt Busch reclaimed the first position as Smith moved into second. On lap 94, Burton's engine failed, but no caution was given. Two laps later, Robby Gordon became the leader, after having assistance from Bayne. On the 100th lap, McMurray reclaimed the first position. On the following lap, Newman became the leader, but after four laps, Gordon passed him for the position. On lap 107, the eighth caution was given after Montoya spun following a bump from teammate McMurray. During the caution all the drivers made pit stops, with Gordon reclaiming the lead afterward. On lap 110, Kurt Busch moved to the first position, but after four laps, he was passed by Bowyer. Bowyer was passed by Truex two laps later on lap 116, but Truex Jr. himself was passed by Busch on the next lap.

On the 118th lap, Bowyer and Menard moved to the first two positions. By lap 120, the race had experienced 47 lead changes among 18 different leaders. Two laps later, Truex reclaimed the first position, as the ninth caution was given for Kvapil. During the caution, most of the front runners made pit stops. At the lap 127 restart, Truex led the field to the green flag, but on the following lap, Bowyer passed him. Seven laps later, the tenth caution was given after Kenseth collided with the wall. Some of the front runners made pit stops during the caution.
On the lap 140 restart, Bowyer was the leader, but after one lap, Truex passed him. On lap 143, the eleventh caution was given following contact between Greg Biffle and Montoya. More of the front runners made pit stops again during the caution. At the lap 146 restart, Truex was the leader. One lap later, Earnhardt Jr. claimed the lead for six laps before Newman passed him. On lap 158, a record twelfth caution was given, as Kvapil collided with the wall. Most of the drivers made pit stops during the caution, with Newman the leader. On the lap 163 restart, Newman was the leader ahead of Hamlin and Earnhardt. On the following lap, Hamlin became the leader, as Montoya moved up to third.
On lap 167, the thirteenth caution was caused by Keselowski colliding with the wall. The accident also involved Smith and Logano. At the lap 170 restart, Hamlin was the leader, but on the following lap he was passed by Earnhardt Jr.

On the next lap, Newman became the leader, as Logano drove to pit road. On the 173rd lap, Menard moved to the third position, after having assistance from Stewart. Two laps later, Ragan became the leader, but two laps later, Bowyer reclaimed the position. On lap 179, Newman moved up to the first position, as Earnhardt moved to eleventh. Three laps later, Kahne collided with the wall, prompting the caution to come out. On the same lap, McMurray had one cylinder to fail. At the lap 185 restart, Newman remained the leader. On the following lap, Earnhardt and Stewart moved into the third and fourth positions. On lap 192, Bowyer moved up to the third position, then to the first position. Three laps later, Smith moved into the first position. On lap 197, the fifteenth caution was given after Smith spun sideways, as Bowyer was also involved and sustained major damage. During the caution, Earnhardt made a pit stop because of a possible deflating tire. At the lap 202 restart, for a green-white-checker finish, Ragan was the leader, ahead of Bayne.

On the ensuing restart, Ragan was black flagged for changing lanes before the start / finish line just before the sixteenth caution came out after a three-car accident, involving Earnhardt Jr.; Newman; and Truex Jr. During the caution, Ragan drove to pit road, giving the lead to Trevor Bayne, with Labonte second. On the final lap of a second green-white-checker finish, Edwards and David Gilliland mounted a charge on the inside lane. Exiting turn four, Edwards drew alongside Labonte and closed in on Bayne, who moved to the bottom to block Edwards and maintained the lead to win his first race in his Sprint Cup Series career at the age of 20. Edwards finished second, ahead of Gilliland in third and Labonte in fourth. Kurt Busch clinched the fifth position; Montoya, Smith, Kyle Busch, Menard, and Martin rounded out the top ten finishers in the race.

Post-race

The 20-year-old, Bayne, appeared in victory lane after his victory lap to start celebrating his first win of his Sprint Cup Series career, in front of a crowd of 182,000 people.  Also by winning the race, he became the youngest winner of the Daytona 500 at 20 years and one day. Jeff Gordon previously held the title at 25 years old. The race was Bayne's second Sprint Cup Series start, and became the Wood Brothers Racing team's fifth Daytona 500 win. He also became the second driver to win the race in his first attempt, with the other being Lee Petty who won the 1959 Daytona 500, which was the inaugural race. With the win coming in his second start in the Sprint Cup Series, Bayne also matched Jamie McMurray for quickest victory at the start of a career; however, since Bayne was racing for the Nationwide Series points championship, he did not earn any Sprint Cup points for the win. The race victory was the Wood Brothers first win since the 2001 season. Following his win, he described his happiness, "If I tried to put it into words, I couldn't do it any justice."

Following the race, which experienced a record 16 cautions and 74 lead changes, among 22 different drivers, Edwards commented, "A new winner, up-and-coming guy that's tied to so much history. This is as good as it gets. If people aren't watching, that's their problem, because we got some great stuff going on here."  In the post-race press conference, the third-place finisher, Gilliland, said, "It's a credit to NASCAR and their new rules, trying to get the (cars) closer, to let teams like us have a chance to be competitive. A lot of the rules (are) making these races more competitive." Jeff Gordon also commented about Bayne, "I think it's very cool. Trevor's a good kid, and I love the Wood Brothers. I'm really happy for him. And I think it's great for the sport. To have a young talent like that – he's got that spark, you know?"

Ragan, who was the leader before the fifteenth caution, described his frustration after being black flagged by saying, "It was tough to swallow. Who knows what would have happened in that next lap? We had a top-five car [Sunday] and we didn't finish in the top five, so that's a bummer. We had a car that could've won the Daytona 500. We were sitting in position and just didn't do it. This thing only comes around once a year, so I'll think about it until we throw the checkered flag on next year's Daytona 500. So it's tough, but there is a bright side – we finished, we got some points and we ran up front, but we just didn't get what we come down here to do."

As Bayne was running for the Nationwide Series Championship and was thus ineligible to receive points, the result left Edwards leading the Driver's Championship with 42 points. Gilliland, who finished third, was second with 41, which was tied with Bobby Labonte and was one point ahead of Kurt Busch. Montoya was fifth with 39 points. In the Manufacturers' Championship, Ford became the leader with 9 points. Toyota became second with 6 points. Dodge followed with 4 points, one point ahead of Chevrolet in fourth. 15.6 million people watched the race on television. The race took three hours, fifty-nine minutes and twenty-four seconds to complete, and the margin of victory was 0.118 seconds.

Results

Qualifying

Race

Standings after the race

Note: Only the top five positions are included for the driver standings.

References

Daytona 500
Daytona 500
NASCAR races at Daytona International Speedway
February 2011 sports events in the United States